Quayshawn Nealy (born August 5, 1991) is an American football linebacker who is currently a free agent. He has also been a member of the Seattle Seahawks, Tampa Bay Buccaneers, and Arizona Cardinals. He played college football at Georgia Tech.

Professional career

Seattle Seahawks
On May 2, 2015, Nealy was signed by the Seattle Seahawks as an undrafted free agent. On August 31, 2015, he was waived.

Tampa Bay Buccaneers
Nealy was signed with the Tampa Bay Buccaneers on November 4, 2015. On November 17, 2015, he was released.

Arizona Cardinals
Nealy was signed to the Arizona Cardinals' practice squad on January 12, 2016. On July 27, 2016, he was released.

Seattle Seahawks (II) 
On August 15, 2016 Nealy was signed again by the Seahawks. On August 30, 2016, he was waived by the Seahawks.

Toronto Argonauts 
On February 2, 2017, Nealy and the Toronto Argonauts of the Canadian Football League (CFL) agreed to a contract. Nealy was released by the Argonauts on May 28, 2017.

References

External links
Tampa Bay Buccaneers bio

1991 births
Living people
American football linebackers
Canadian football linebackers
American players of Canadian football
Seattle Seahawks players
Tampa Bay Buccaneers players
Arizona Cardinals players